Sudhindra Bhaumik (born 22 April 1946) is a vocalist of the Agra Gharana.

Early life
He was born in 1946 in Bangalore, Karnataka where he learned for many years under Ramarao Naik.

Career
He continued to learn under S.C.R Bhatt, K. G. Ginde and Dinkar Kaikini. Bhaumik also learned from Thumri singer Shobha Gurtu and have received guidance under Y.M. Mahale, another veteran of the Agra Gharana.

References

1945 births
Living people
Agra gharana
Indian classical musicians
Musicians from Bangalore